Marquesan is a collection of East-Central Polynesian dialects, of the Marquesic group, spoken in the Marquesas Islands of French Polynesia. They are usually classified into two groups, North Marquesan and South Marquesan, roughly along geographic lines.

Phonology

Like other Polynesian languages, the phonology of Marquesan languages is characterized by a scarcity of consonants and a comparative abundance of vowels. The consonant phonemes are:

The vowel phonemes are the same as in other Polynesian languages, long and short versions of each:

Alphabet

A E F H I K M N O P R S T U V 
a e f h i k m n o p r s t u v

Morpho-syntax

Noun and verb phrases 
Verbal particles are placed before the verb they modify.

A noun phrase in Marquesan is any phrase beginning with either a case marker or a determiner. Case markers or prepositions always precede the determiners, which in turn precede the number markers. As such, they all precede the noun they modify.

There are 11 personal pronouns which are distinguished by singular, dual, and plural. As well as that, there are two other personal pronouns which distinguish possession.

Complex sentences use verbal nouns in subordinate clauses.

Hanaiapa, o Tua-i-kaie, ua noho me te vehine pootu oko

Possession 
Margaret Mutu & Ben Teìkitutoua (2002) present descriptions and examples of possession in Ùa Pou (a north Marquesan dialect). All examples in this section are taken from their work. See notes for more information.

Possession in Marquesan is marked by prepositional particles affixed to the noun phrase which they modify. These prepositional particles relate the phrase as a whole to other parts of the sentence or discourse and therefore can be considered centrifugal particles.  Possession is essentially different from the other types of adposition modification in that it marks a relationship between two noun phrases as opposed to that between the verbal phrase and the noun phrase.

There are four possession markers in Marquesan.

a and o possessive prepositions 
In these examples, the relation of two noun phases with the use of the possessive prepositions  and  can be seen. The preposition is affixed to the possessor noun phrase which in turn dominates the possessed phrase.

na and no attributive, possessive prepositions 
In these examples, we see the relation of constituents which form a noun phrase. This is an example of attributive, alienable possession.

Dominant vs subordinate possession 
Marquesan distinguishes between two contrastive types of possession. The first can be described in very broad terms as possession in which the possessor is dominant, active, superior, or in control of the possessed.  and  mark this type of possession:

On the other hand,  and  indicate possession where the possessor is subordinate, passive, inferior to, or lacking in control over the possessed:

Locative phrases
Locative constructions in Marquesan follow this pattern (elements in parentheses are optional):

 Preposition - (Modifier) - lexical head - (Directional) - (Demonstrative) - (Modifier) - Possessive Attribute/Attributive Noun Phrases

This locative syntactic pattern is common among Polynesian languages.

Dialect diversity
North Marquesan is spoken in the northern islands (Nuku Hiva, Ua Pou, and Ua Huka), and South Marquesan in the southern islands (Hiva Oa, Tahuata, and Fatu Hiva). In Ua Huka, which was almost entirely depopulated in the 19th century and repopulated with people from both the Northern and Southern Marquesas, the language shares traits of both North Marquesan and South Marquesan. Comparative data on the various dialects of Marquesan can be found in the Linguistic Atlas of French Polynesia (Charpentier & François 2015).

The table below compares a selection of words in various dialectal varieties of Marquesan, according to the Linguistic Atlas of French Polynesia, with their pronunciation in the IPA. Tahitian and Hawaiian are also added for comparison.

The northern dialects fall roughly into four groups:

 Tai Pi, spoken in the eastern third of Nuku Hiva, and according to some linguists, a separate language, Tai Pi Marquesan
 Teiʻi, spoken in western Nuku Hiva
 Eastern Ua Pou
 Western Ua Pou

The southern dialects fall roughly into three groups:

 Pepane: Eastern Hiva ʻOa and Ua Huka
 Fatu Hiva
 Nuku: Western Hiva ʻOa and Tahuata

North Marquesan exhibits some original characteristics. North Marquesan, like South Island Māori dialects of New Zealand, prefers .

The dialects of Ua Huka are often incorrectly classified as North Marquesan; they are instead transitional. While the island is in the northern Marquesas group, the dialects show more morphological and phonological affinities with South Marquesan. The North Marquesan dialects are sometimes considered two separate languages: North Marquesan and Tai Pi Marquesan, the latter being spoken in the valleys of the eastern third of the island of Nuku Hiva, in the ancient province of Tai Pi. Puka-Pukan, spoken in Puka-Puka and the Disappointment Islands in northeastern Tuamotu, is a dialect of South Marquesan, and should not be confused with the homonymous Pukapukan language spoken in Pukapuka, one of the Cook Islands.

References

Further reading
 
 
 
 
 Bernice Pauahi Bishop Museum Bulletins.

External links
Online version of the Grammaire et dictionnaire de la langue des Iles Marquises – Marquisien–Français (Paris, Institut d'Ethnologie, 1931) 
Aperçu de la langue des îles Marquises et de la langue taïtienne, accompagné d'un vocabulaire inédit de la langue taïtienne (Johann Buschmann & Guillaume de Humboldt, Berlin, 1843) 
DoBeS — Marquesan language
Box of 458 index cards of plant and animal names archived with Kaipuleohone

Marquesan culture
Marquesic languages
Languages of French Polynesia